Caecidotea barri, commonly known as the Clifton Cave isopod, is a species of crustacean in the family Asellidae. It is endemic to the United States.

References

Crustaceans of the United States
Asellota
Taxonomy articles created by Polbot
Crustaceans described in 1965